Bourbon Township may refer to the following townships in the United States:

 Bourbon Township, Douglas County, Illinois
 Bourbon Township, Marshall County, Indiana
 Bourbon Township, Boone County, Missouri
 Bourbon Township, Callaway County, Missouri